The 2016 World Outdoor Bowls Championship women's singles  was held at the Burnside Bowling Club in Avonhead, Christchurch, New Zealand, from 29 November to 4 December 2016.

The women's singles gold medal went to Karen Murphy of Australia. It was her second consecutive singles title after having won in 2012 as well.

Section tables

Section 1

Section 2

Finals

Results

References

Bow
Wom
Wor